Psalm 26, the 26th psalm of the Book of Psalms in the Bible, begins (in the King James Version): "Judge me, O LORD; for I have walked in mine integrity". 

The Book of Psalms is part of the third section of the Hebrew Bible, and a book of the Christian Old Testament. In the slightly different numbering system used in the Greek Septuagint and Latin Vulgate translations of the Bible, this psalm is Psalm 25. In Latin, it is known as "Iudica me Domine". The psalm is attributed to David by its sub-title. Albert Barnes argues that "there is no reason to doubt the correctness of the superscription", but according to Charles and Emilie Briggs, it is to be dated within the Persian period (539 to 333 BCE). The Briggs describe the psalm as  They add that the "elements of prayer and worship" in verses 9 to 11 are additions by a later editor.

The psalm forms a regular part of Jewish, Catholic, Lutheran, Anglican and Nonconformist Protestant liturgies.

Text

Hebrew Bible version 
The following is the Hebrew text of Psalm 26:

King James Version 
 Judge me, O LORD; for I have walked in mine integrity: I have trusted also in the LORD; therefore I shall not slide.
 Examine me, O LORD, and prove me; try my reins and my heart.
 For thy lovingkindness is before mine eyes: and I have walked in thy truth.
 I have not sat with vain persons, neither will I go in with dissemblers.
 I have hated the congregation of evil doers; and will not sit with the wicked.
 I will wash mine hands in innocency: so will I compass thine altar, O LORD:
 That I may publish with the voice of thanksgiving, and tell of all thy wondrous works.
 LORD, I have loved the habitation of thy house, and the place where thine honour dwelleth.
 Gather not my soul with sinners, nor my life with bloody men:
 In whose hands is mischief, and their right hand is full of bribes.
 But as for me, I will walk in mine integrity: redeem me, and be merciful unto me.
 My foot standeth in an even place: in the congregations will I bless the LORD.

Structure
The psalm is divided into 2 parts 
 Verses 1-11: Pleas and affirmation of justice for the Psalmist 
 Verse 12: certainty of being heard and confident vows

The following observations can be made: 
 The absence of a complaint. The peculiarity of the absence of an action falls on the Psalm: there is no reference to the wicked, which poses a risk for the psalmist in any way.
 The highlighting of the temple. The psalm refers not only to the "house of the Lord" (verse 8) and "Assembly" (verse 12), but also to the rites that are performed by the Psalmist in the Temple: the symbolic washing of hands, the circumambulation of the altar (verse 6) and the subsequent singing (verse 7).

Uses

New Testament 

Speculatively, this psalm is referenced in the story of the public trial of Jesus. After succumbing to the wishes of the gathered crowd, Pontius Pilate purportedly washed his hands to show his innocence of their judgement. In the account, this could function as an outward display of someone mechanically following the psalm verse, but it would be apparent to the original Jewish audience that his abdication of the responsibility of judging justly was not in its spirit.

Judaism 
In Judaism, verse 8 is the third verse of Ma Tovu.

Catholic Church 
According to the monastic tradition this psalm was since St. Benedict of Nursia, performed during the celebration of matins of Sundays. Today, Psalm 26 is recited or sung during the Daytime Hours on Friday Week 1.

Verses 6-12 are said during the Lavabo (washing of the hands) of the Tridentine Mass.

Book of Common Prayer 
In the Church of England's Book of Common Prayer, this psalm is appointed to be read on the morning of the fifth day of the month.

Musical setting 
Heinrich Schütz wrote a setting of a metric paraphrase of Psalm 26 in German, "Herr, schaff mir Recht, nimm dich mein an", SWV 123, for the Becker Psalter, published first in 1628.

References

External links 

 
 
  Mechon-mamre: Hebrew and English
 Text of Psalm 26 according to the 1928 Psalter
 Of David. / Judge me, LORD! / For I have walked in my integrity. text and footnotes, usccb.org United States Conference of Catholic Bishops
 Psalm 26:1 introduction and text, biblestudytools.com
 Psalm 26 – Standing in an Even Place enduringword.com
 Psalm 26 / Refrain: Lord, I love the place where your glory abides. Church of England
 Psalm 26 at biblegateway.com
 Hymns for Psalm 26 hymnary.org

026
Works attributed to David